Gertrude Gries (born 16 October 1924) was an Austrian gymnast. She competed at the 1948 Summer Olympics and the 1952 Summer Olympics.

References

External links
 

1924 births
Possibly living people
Austrian female artistic gymnasts
Olympic gymnasts of Austria
Gymnasts at the 1948 Summer Olympics
Gymnasts at the 1952 Summer Olympics
Place of birth missing (living people)
20th-century Austrian women